The Apartment is a reality television show created by Riaz Mehta and produced by Imagine Group. Premiering in 2011 on Star World, it is currently the longest running reality competition television show in Asia. From season 2, it is presented by Jamie Durie (Kahi Lee hosted the inaugural season), while the judges include Laurence Llewelyn-Bowen and Genevieve Gorder among others.

The show sees contestants design and decorate a room each week in order to compete for the series end prize of a luxury apartment in Kuala Lumpur. The fourth season was a celebrity version where the prize was $100,000 to be donated to their chosen charity. The fifth season had the prize of $100,000 for the winners. The sixth season, The Apartment - Passion For Design had twelve interior designers competing for a luxury apartment at Johor Bahru, Malaysia. With the sixth series an online digital series, The Apartment Unboxed, was launched alongside the main show and included additional content.

Judges

Season

International versions

Indonesian version 
An Indonesian version of The Apartment (also known as Master Desain Apartemen) airs on MNCTV (for season 1) and GTV (for season 2). The first episode of the show premiered on September 3, 2017 and each episode is broadcast every Sunday, at 16:00 WIB (Western Indonesian Time). The show is hosted by Fenita Arie who gives the challenge and a panel including Matthew Munesh and Cosmas Gozali judge their work. The final winners were announced after the last episode, and the prize was their own apartment in The Ayodhya, Alam Sutera, in Tangerang. The first season winner is musician Alexis Brille.

References

2011 Malaysian television series debuts
2010s reality television series